The 1949–50 Bradley Braves men's basketball team represented Bradley University in college basketball during the 1949–50 season. The team finished the season with a 32–5 record and were national runners-up to the City College of New York (CCNY) in both the 1950 NCAA tournament and 1950 National Invitation Tournament. Early on in the NCAA Tournament's days, which began in 1939, teams were allowed to participate in both it and the NIT. The 1949–50 college basketball season is noteworthy in that it is the only year in which a team won both tournaments (CCNY), and the losing team of both championships happened to be Bradley.

Schedule and results

|-
!colspan=9 style="background:#BA122B; color:#FFFFFF;"|  Regular season

|-
!colspan=9 style="background:#BA122B; color:#FFFFFF;"| 1950 National Invitation Tournament

|-
!colspan=9 style="background:#BA122B; color:#FFFFFF;"| 1950 NCAA Tournament

Source

Rankings

References

Bradley Braves men's basketball seasons
NCAA Division I men's basketball tournament Final Four seasons
Bradley
Bradley
Bradley
Bradley Braves Men's Basketball Team
Bradley Braves Men's Basketball Team